Ernest Bannister (born 1883; date of death unknown) was an English footballer who play one game in the Football League for Manchester City. He also spent time with  Buxton, Preston North End, Port Vale, Darlington, Heart of Midlothian, and Ayr United.

Career
Bannister began his career at Buxton, before he joined Manchester City. He made his debut for the club against Bury at Gigg Lane on 29 February 1908. He then joined Preston North End, without making a first team appearance, before he joined Port Vale in October 1911. He played one game for the club, in a 2–1 defeat to Everton Reserves in a Central League match on 28 October. He was released at the end of the 1911–12 season. He went on to play for Darlington, Heart of Midlothian, and Ayr United.

Career statistics
Source:

References

1883 births
Year of death unknown
People from Buxton
Footballers from Derbyshire
English footballers
Association football forwards
Buxton F.C. players
Manchester City F.C. players
Preston North End F.C. players
Port Vale F.C. players
Darlington F.C. players
Heart of Midlothian F.C. players
Ayr United F.C. players
English Football League players
Scottish Football League players